Rubiera is a surname. Notable people with the surname include:

Baldomero Rubiera (1926–2018), Cuban gymnast
José Luis Rubiera (born 1973), Spanish road bicycle racer
María Jesús Rubiera Mata (1942–2009), Spanish historian

Spanish-language surnames